Chervone is an urban-type settlement in Berdychiv Raion, Zhytomyr Oblast, Ukraine. Population: 

The  built in 1851, an object of cultural heritage, is located in the village.

References

External links
 History of Chervone

Urban-type settlements in Berdychiv Raion
Volhynian Governorate